Alfred Heinrich may refer to:
 Alfred Heinrich (ice hockey)
 Alfred Heinrich (rower)